Kristen Britain is an American author. She wrote Green Rider (which was nominated for the Crawford Award), First Rider's Call, The High King's Tomb, Blackveil (which was nominated for the David Gemmell Legend Award), and Mirror Sight. The sixth book in the Green Rider series, Firebrand, was released February 28, 2017. The seventh book "Winterlight" was released September 2021.

Early life and education
Britain grew up in the Finger Lakes region of New York State, where she started her first novel — an undersea fantasy featuring herself and her friends — at the age of nine. She published her first book, a cartoon collection called Horses and Horsepeople, at the age of thirteen.

After completing her degree in film production, with a minor in writing, at Ithaca College in 1987, she went to work for the National Park Service in 1988 after a conversation with a park ranger during a visit to Women's Rights National Historical Park.

Career
Her first ranger job was a seasonal position at Clara Barton National Historic Site in Maryland. 
At the time of the publication of her first novel, Green Rider, she was working full-time as a park ranger at Acadia National Park, and she drew much of the inspiration for the landscape of Sacoridia from the park. Her many years as a park ranger enabled her to work in a variety of natural and historical settings, from 300 feet below the surface of the Earth to 13,000 feet above sea level on the Continental Divide; and from the textile mills of the American Industrial Revolution to the homes of Americans who changed the course of history.

Personal life
She lives in Maine.

Literary career
Kristen Britain's first novel, "Green Rider", was published by DAW Books in November 1998. It was nominated in 1999 for both the Locus Award for Best First Novel and the William L. Crawford - IAFA Fantasy Award, short Crawford Award. The fourth novel in her Green Rider series, "Blackveil", was nominated for the 2011 Goodreads Fantasy Award.

Published works

Green Rider Series
Green Rider (1998,  US paperback;  UK paperback)
First Rider's Call (2003,  US paperback;  UK paperback) (initial working title was Mirror of the Moon)
The High King's Tomb (2007)
Blackveil (2011, hardcover)
Mirror Sight (2014, hardcover)
Firebrand (2017, hardcover)
The Dream Gatherer (2018, hardcover); collection of Green Rider short fiction
Winterlight (2021, hardcover)

Short stories
Linked, on the Lake of Souls in DAW 30th Anniversary Anthology: Fantasy 2003
Avalonia Out Of Avalon 2001
Justine and the Mountie in Imaginary Friends 2008
Chafing the Bogey Man in Misspelled 2008

References

External links
Kristen Britain's official website
SciFan page
Interview at SFFWorld.com
 Photo, covers, reviews at Fantasy Literature

The story behind the Green Rider Series - Online Essay by Kristen Britain at Upcoming4.me

20th-century American novelists
21st-century American novelists
American fantasy writers
American women short story writers
American women novelists
Ithaca College alumni
Living people
Women science fiction and fantasy writers
20th-century American women writers
21st-century American women writers
20th-century American short story writers
21st-century American short story writers
1965 births